John Miller Srodes (July 17, 1809 – September 30, 1882) was a Union Army officer during the American Civil War.

Early life
John Miller Srodes was born on Grant's Hill in Pittsburgh, Allegheny County, Pennsylvania on July 17, 1809. A story from his childhood says that he got angry at his brothers one day and ran away. He was captured by Indians, and his brothers could not find him. He pretended to like the Indians in order to escape. In reality, it seems that he enjoyed living with the Indians since he stayed with them for two or three years. He did finally return home, however, when an opportunity arose to do so. His granddaughter Lida Olive Bickerstaff remembers him telling her stories about when he lived with the Indians and teaching her their language, life, and customs.

Srodes experience living with the Indians probably shaped his life in the following two areas. First, it probably shaped his attitude towards those of other races. Many years later, when his granddaughter Lida saw a "colored" person for the first time, she ran away into the house. But Srodes went inside, picked her up, took her outside, and had her talk with the man. His long journey overland from the Indians to his home also may have set the stage for future journeys he would take. Three times Srodes walked from New Orleans to Pittsburgh after having arrived in New Orleans on a flatboat.

Military career

Srodes was a ship captain who piloted boats from Pittsburgh to Cairo, Illinois and Memphis, Tennessee. He served his country as a captain in the Mexican War under General Zachary Taylor and fought in several battles on Taylor's drive to Mexico City. In the Civil War, John served as captain of the Ram Lioness of the Mississippi Marine Brigade from April 28 to July 16, 1862, when he was discharged.

The Lioness was part of the Ram Fleet under the command of Colonel Charles Ellet, Jr. The Ram Fleet was a fleet of nine steam-powered rams that played a role in winning domination of the Mississippi River by the Union. Ellet's nine rams were converted steam ships fitted with a reinforced prow. Unarmed, the ships were designed simply to ram into the side of enemy ships and sink them. Rams were an old idea that was revived after the development of steam propulsion. Ellet initially tried to convince the Navy to let him develop a ram fleet, but he was rejected. So he took his idea directly to Secretary of War Edwin M. Stanton, who gave Ellet permission to build and command the fleet.

Ellet personally led the fleet in the Battle of Memphis on June 6, 1862. After handily defeating the Confederate flotilla, Ellet noticed a white flag flying over Memphis. Having been wounded, Ellet sent his son, Medical Cadet Charles Rivers Ellet, to attend to the surrender of the city. Charles Rivers Ellet was escorted to shore by Srodes aboard the Lioness, which was the last ram to arrive on the scene because it was hauling coal for the fleet. Charles Rivers Ellet, who had joined the fleet just five days earlier on his nineteenth birthday, took a rowboat ashore along with three other Union soldiers and demanded the surrender of the city from Mayor John Park. Since the Confederate army had already left, the mayor was powerless to surrender and the Union army was not ready to occupy Memphis. Ellet, however, demanded that they be permitted to hoist the American flag over the post office as a symbol of the fall of Memphis. The mayor advised them against doing so, saying that he could not ensure their safety. Ellet, however, did not listen to the mayor and convinced the mayor to escort his party of four to the post office. When they arrived at the post office, several civilians escorted Ellet and one other to the fourth floor, and they created a makeshift flag stand to fly the Union flag. As they admired their work, someone closed the trapdoor and stranded them on the roof. The people of the city, noticing the Union flag, began to yell and fire shots at the men of the roof.

The mayor, fearing that the city would be bombarded because of the antics of the people, made his way back to the Lioness and yelled for help. Srodes then came ashore and threatened to fire on the city "if those men are not released in ten minutes." He then suggested that the mayor assemble the police force to disperse the crowd. The Lioness had no guns, though: to give a show of force, Srodes sent all of the ship's marines ashore armed with carbines and hand grenades. Thousands of people jeered at the marines as they made their way to the post office. Soon, however, a warehouse below town exploded, and the people dispersed to investigate the explosion. Srodes placed four men on guard at the entrance of the post office and sent others up to the fourth floor to rescue their comrades. Srodes details the aftermath of the Battle of Memphis in his diary:

 "June 5. All well and our navy and troops in full possession of Fort Pillow at 5:30 A.M. It is one of the strongest forts I ever saw. If they had the spunk and courage we had, one hundred and fifty thousand men couldn't take the fort with fifty thousand. I can't describe the amount of guns and property other than fortress is good. Orders to move to Memphis and we took up the line of march. We advanced on down to Cypress Bend and all the Rams lay to. The gunboats at the head of the Old Hen lay to until June 6 at 4:30 A.M. The whole fleet moved on quietly until the foot of the Chickens at Memphis. The enemy's gunboats commenced. Three shots were fired from the enemy before our gunboats got in to the line of battle. The enemy turned tail for retreat, but our gunboats and the Rams stopped their retreat before they got to the head of President Island. We captured and sank all but one and she may thank the Lord that they are human men on the Rams. Saving scalded and drowning, deluded men and crews, and putting out the fires. The victory is glorious, but the slaughter of rebels is great. No man on earth can tell their loss. It is immense. Some boats went down and all their crews. The fight was short. Orders for Lioness, 9:30 A.M., to take flag of truce and dispatch banner and lieutenant. Dispatch banner was Surgeon Ellet. The dispatch was for the surrender of Memphis. The time for return of banner was up. A dispatch came on board the mob had shut them up. Capt. Srodes dispatched to the city authorities that he would give them 20 minutes for the safe return of the flag banner, and cut loose then to give orders for shelling the town. He got but a short distance from the shore till the river was checkered with small boats, flags of truce in all directions, calling for Capt. Srodes not to shell the town. The city authorities were with him and guaranteed the safe return of our men. Capt. Srodes saw Lt. Crandall with a rebel flag, waving it at Jeff's Greeks. In the great excitement in Memphis, I suppose that had not even been seen, but it came all right on board. Ours is waving on the postoffice. The flag is the Lioness flag that the owners gave her. All excitement—Union men laying down rebel flags and running Union up. The mob is St. Louis pilots and engineers that never were of any account, and worse. Now 12 A. M. All quiet as yet. One little fire up in pinch, among the whiskey heads forepart of the night."

During his military service, Srodes was injured by a shell that went through his back and caused an injury to his spine. This happened in May or June 1862 while he was on the Yazoo River. Srodes also contracted malarial fever. He was treated for his injury and illness on board the Lioness by medical officers from the Ram Fleet.

Family and later life
On October 14, 1830, Srodes married Eliza Quinn. They had seven children: William Quinn, Sarah Ann, John Q., Ellen Hood, Margaretta Pugh, Mary Alwilda, and Anna Eliza. Eliza died of consumption on Christmas Day in 1856. Srodes was away on one of his trips as a riverboat captain and did not find out about her death until he arrived back home. Srodes remarried Nancy Galbraith Chase in Pittsburgh on December 17, 1857. In his latter years, Srodes was an innkeeper in Phillipsburg, Beaver County, Pennsylvania. He died of paralysis at his home along the Ohio River bank in Phillipsburg on September 30, 1882.

References
 Hearn, Chester G. Ellet's Brigade: The Strangest Outfit of All. Baton Rouge: Louisiana State University Press. 2000.
 Taylor, I. T. America's Greatest Pioneer Family: History of the Shrode Family in America. Nashville: McQuiddy Print, 1945.

1809 births
1882 deaths
Union Army officers
Military personnel from Pittsburgh
People of Pennsylvania in the American Civil War
American military personnel of the Mexican–American War